Fraternity of peoples (Russian language: Дружба народов, druzhba narodov) is a concept advanced by Marxist social class theory. According to Marxism, nationalism is only a tool of the ruling class, used to keep the working class divided and thus easier to control and exploit. With the success of class struggle (i.e. the abolition of social classes), the natural brotherhood of all workers would make the idea of separate nations obsolete. 

The concept of the fraternity of the peoples is often opposed to "bourgeois cosmopolitanism". The concept of "fraternity of peoples" was opposed to the concept of internationalism. In this context, the notion of internationalism was explained as "bourgeois cosmopolitanism", so the notion of "internationalism" was conceptually replaced by the notion of "international socialism", also known as "proletarian internationalism".

The Tsarist Russian Empire was dubbed the "prison of the peoples" ("Тюрьма народов") by Vladimir Lenin. The Soviet Union, which replaced the empire, proclaimed that the goal of its national policy was to forge a new national entity, the "Soviet people". Even though the Soviet Union often claimed to make significant progress on "the nationalities question", its dissolution came about largely due to inter-ethnic conflict and like other communist countries a privileged nationality (in this case the Russians, in Yugoslavia the Serbs, in Vietnam the ethnic Vietnamese and in China the Han Chinese) had more political and economic power.

The Constitution of the USSR of 1977 states: "The union of the working class, the collective farm peasantry and the people's intelligentsia, the fraternity of peoples and nationalities of the USSR have been strengthened."

Notes

See also 
 Bourgeois nationalism
 Cosmopolitanism
 Proletarian internationalism

External links 
 On the National Pride of the Great Russians article by Lenin

Anti-nationalism
Internationalism
Marxist terminology
Social classes
Soviet phraseology